Nimintabba ( DNimin-tab-ba, previously read Dimtabba) was a Goddess of Sumer. She is thought to have been a local deity of the city of Ur, as her only known temple was located there. Her worship was particularly associated with king Shulgi (reigned c. 2094 – c. 2046 BC), and there are no previous attestations of her.

Attestations

A Temple was built for her at Ur by the Sumerian king Shulgi, circa 2100 BCE. The remains of the Temple were excavated in Ur by Wolley. Various artifacts with the name Nimintabba were found in the vicinity of the Temple. She seems to have been a rather minor, local deity.

Nimintabba is also known from a famous dedicatory inscription by Shulgi, found in the foundation of the Nimintabba Temple of Ur, and now in the British Museum (ME 118560). 

A foundation figurine was also found under the northeastern wall of Temple of the Goddess Nimintabba, encased within baked brick boxes, and accompanied by steatite tablets, with the figurine positioned standing and leaning north east. The steatite tablets rested on the bottom of the sealed box. The male figurine represents the king Shulgi, a connection provided by the historical implication of the figure's posture. The posture of the figurine replicates the posture associated with royal iconography established in the mid-third millennium BCE. The basket atop the head of the figurine also resembles images of Assurbanipal (686-627 BCE) with a basket on top of his head. Inscriptions connect this image with the construction of the temple. These pieces of evidence combined with the inscription on the lower half of the figures contribute to the probability that the figurine under the Temple of the Goddess Nimintabba was a dedication to Nimintabba by Shulgi, claiming responsibility for the construction of the temple.

References

Mesopotamian goddesses
Ur